Eric Lindley (born December 10, 1982) is an American artist, writer, and musician working primarily in Los Angeles and New York City under the name Careful. His work includes recorded and live "glitch folk," works of fiction, poetry, performance art, photography, and interactive installation.

After getting degrees in physics and music at Dartmouth College, Lindley studied composition with James Tenney, at The California Institute of the Arts. Still at Cal Arts, he released "Nightcat!" under the name Careful, and scored numerous short and feature films, as well as several performance works. He was active in the Los Angeles music scene, playing with Anna Oxygen, Lucky Dragons, and Phil Elverum of The Microphones at venues like The Smell.

In 2008, he moved to New York, where he released both "Careful" and "Oh, Light," the latter recorded in his partner's closet in Washington Heights, Manhattan. There, he also recorded a cover of Lady Gaga's "Bad Romance."

Discography
Nightcat! (Sounds Super Recordings, 2006)
Careful (Sounds Super Recordings, 2010)
Oh, Light (Sounds Super Recordings, 2010)
Because I Am Always Talking (2012)
The World Doesn't End (2014)

References

External links
Official website
Poems by Eric Lindley in issue #22 of InDigest

American male writers
American artists
Dartmouth College alumni
Living people
1982 births
21st-century American singers
21st-century American male singers